The UEFA European Under-18 Championship 1959 Final Tournament was held in Bulgaria.

Teams
The following teams entered the tournament:

 
  (host)

Group stage

Group A

Group B

Group C

Group D

Semifinals

Third place match

Final

External links
Results by RSSSF

UEFA European Under-19 Championship
Under-18
UEFA European Under-18 Championship
1959
UEFA European Under-18 Championship
UEFA European Under-18 Championship
UEFA European Under-18 Championship, 1959
Sports competitions in Sofia
UEFA European Under-18 Championship